Empire of Wild is a novel written by Cherie Dimaline, which was released on September 17, 2019, by Penguin Random House Canada.

Synopsis 
The novel follows a Métis woman named Joan Beausoliel as she searches for her husband, Victor, who went missing nearly a year ago in a Walmart parking lot following an argument the two had had. She meets Reverend Eugene Wolff, a traveling preacher who bears a striking resemblance Victor and has no memory of his past. Joan is joined by her twelve year old cousin Zeus as she investigates Victor's disappearance. Joan becomes convinced that a conman named Thomas Heiser is a rogaru, and tries to free her husband from his control.

Development 
The idea for the plot of Empire of Wild came to Dimaline when she had gone to a First Nations literary event and had no material prepared for her speech. She instead told a story that her grandmother had told her about the rogarou, a creature from Métis folklore. She later read an article about missionaries coming to First Nations in Canada, and was frustrated by the thought of indigenous preachers encouraging people to give up their land for pipelines.

References 

Wikipedia Student Program
First Nations novels